Mathare Youth Football Club was a football club based in Nairobi, Kenya. They played in the Kenyan Premier League, but were relegated in 2008. They last competed in the FKF Division One.

The team was owned by the Mathare Youth Sports Association. The team was a feeder team for Mathare United, until Mathare Youth were promoted to the Premier League to rival them.

On 31 August 2012, the team disbanded and therefore pulled out of the 2012 FKF Division One, after which the Football Kenya Federation decided to nullify all of their second round results. This meant that all teams that had played against them had their points revoked or given back, depending on the results of the matches, and all upcoming fixtures involving them were cancelled.

References

FKF Division One clubs
Football clubs in Kenya
Sport in Nairobi
Association football clubs disestablished in 2012